The Indo-Pakistani War of 1965 or the Second Kashmir War was a culmination of skirmishes that took place between April 1965 and September 1965 between Pakistan and India. The conflict began following Pakistan's Operation Gibraltar, which was designed to infiltrate forces into Jammu and Kashmir to precipitate an insurgency against Indian rule, It became the immediate cause of the war. The seventeen-day war caused thousands of casualties on both sides and witnessed the largest engagement of armored vehicles and the largest tank battle since World War II. Hostilities between the two countries ended after a ceasefire was declared through UNSC Resolution 211 following a diplomatic intervention by the Soviet Union and the United States, and the subsequent issuance of the Tashkent Declaration. Much of the war was fought by the countries' land forces in Kashmir and along the border between India and Pakistan. This war saw the largest amassing of troops in Kashmir since the Partition of India in 1947, a number that was overshadowed only during the 2001–2002 military standoff between India and Pakistan. Most of the battles were fought by opposing infantry and armoured units, with substantial backing from air forces, and naval operations.

India had the upper hand over Pakistan when the ceasefire was declared. Although the two countries fought to a standoff, the conflict is seen as a strategic and political defeat for Pakistan, as it had neither succeeded in fomenting insurrection in Kashmir nor had it been able to gain meaningful support at an international level. However, in terms of air superiority, the PAF managed an upper hand over the combat zones despite being numerically inferior.

Internationally, the war was viewed in the context of the greater Cold War, and resulted in a significant geopolitical shift in the subcontinent. Before the war, the United States and the United Kingdom had been major material allies of both India and Pakistan, as their primary suppliers of military hardware and foreign developmental aid. During and after the conflict, both India and Pakistan felt betrayed by the perceived lack of support by the western powers for their respective positions; those feelings of betrayal were increased with the imposition of an American and British embargo on military aid to the opposing sides. As a consequence, India and Pakistan openly developed closer relationships with the Soviet Union and China, respectively. The perceived negative stance of the western powers during the conflict, and during the 1971 war, has continued to affect relations between the West and the subcontinent. In spite of improved relations with the U.S. and Britain since the end of the Cold War, the conflict generated a deep distrust of both countries within the subcontinent which to an extent lingers to this day.

Background 
Since the Partition of British India in 1947, Pakistan and India remained in contention over several issues. Although the Kashmir conflict was the predominant issue dividing the nations, other border disputes existed, most notably over the Rann of Kutch, a barren region in the Indian state of Gujarat. The issue first arose in 1956 which ended with India regaining control over the disputed area.  In 1960s Pakistan received 700 million dollars of military aid from United States, by signing a defense agreement in 1954, which significantly modernized Pakistan's military equipment. After the defeat in 1962 Sino-Indian War Indian Military was undergoing massive changes both in personnel and equipment. During this period, despite being numerically smaller than the Indian Military, Pakistan's armed forces had a qualitative edge in air power and armor over India, which Pakistan sought to utilize before India completed its defense build-up.

War 

Pakistani soldiers began patrolling in territory controlled by India in January 1965, which was followed by attacks by both countries on each other's posts on 8 April 1965. Initially involving border police from both nations, the disputed area soon witnessed intermittent skirmishes between the countries' armed forces. Pakistan launched Operation Desert Hawk and captured few Indian post near the Kanjarkot fort border area. In June 1965, British Prime Minister Harold Wilson successfully persuaded both countries to end hostilities and set up a tribunal to resolve the dispute.

After its success in the Rann of Kutch, Pakistan, under the leadership of General Ayub Khan, believed the Indian Army would be unable to defend itself against a quick military campaign in the disputed territory of Kashmir as the Indian military had suffered a loss to China in 1962 in the Sino-Indian War. Pakistan believed that the population of Kashmir was generally discontented with Indian rule and that a resistance movement could be ignited by a few infiltrating saboteurs. Pakistan attempted to ignite the resistance movement by means of a covert infiltration, code-named Operation Gibraltar. The Pakistani infiltrators were soon discovered, however, their presence reported by local Kashmiris, and the operation ended unsuccessfully.

On 5 August 1965 between 26,000 and 33,000 Pakistani soldiers crossed the Line of Control dressed as Kashmiri locals headed for various areas within Kashmir. Indian forces, tipped off by the local populace, crossed the cease fire line on 15 August.

Initially, the Indian Army met with considerable success, capturing three important mountain positions after a prolonged artillery barrage. By the end of August, however, both sides had relative progress; Pakistan had made progress in areas such as Tithwal, Uri and Poonch and India had captured the Haji Pir pass, 8 km into Pakistan administered Kashmir.

On 1 September 1965, Pakistan launched a counterattack, called Operation Grand Slam, with the objective to capture the vital town of Akhnoor in Jammu, which would sever communications and cut off supply routes to Indian troops. Ayub Khan calculated that "Hindu morale would not stand more than a couple of hard blows at the right time and place" although by this time Operation Gibraltar had failed and India had captured the Haji Pir Pass. At 03:30 on 1 September 1965, the entire Chhamb area came under massive artillery bombardment. Pakistan had launched operation Grand Slam and India's Army Headquarter was taken by surprise. Attacking with an overwhelming ratio of troops and technically superior tanks, Pakistan made gains against Indian forces, who were caught unprepared and suffered heavy losses. India responded by calling in its air force to blunt the Pakistani attack. The next day, Pakistan retaliated, its air force attacked Indian forces and air bases in both Kashmir and Punjab. India's decision to open up the theatre of attack into Pakistani Punjab forced the Pakistani army to relocate troops engaged in the operation to defend Punjab. Operation Grand Slam therefore failed, as the Pakistan Army was unable to capture Akhnoor; it became one of the turning points in the war when India decided to relieve pressure on its troops in Kashmir by attacking Pakistan further south. In the valley, another area of strategic importance was Kargil. Kargil town was in Indian hands but Pakistan occupied high ground overlooking Kargil and Srinagar-Leh road. However, after the launch of a massive anti-infiltration operation by the Indian army, the Pakistani infiltrators were forced out of that area in the month of August.

India crossed the International Border on the Western front on 6 September. On 6 September, the 15th Infantry Division of the Indian Army, under World War II veteran Major General Niranjan Prasad, battled a massive counterattack by Pakistan near the west bank of the Icchogil Canal (BRB Canal), which was a de facto border of India and Pakistan. The General's entourage itself was ambushed and he was forced to flee his vehicle. A second, this time successful, attempt to cross the Ichhogil Canal was made over the bridge in the village of Barki (Battle of Burki), just east of Lahore. These developments brought the Indian Army within the range of Lahore International Airport. As a result, the United States requested a temporary ceasefire to allow it to evacuate its citizens in Lahore.

The thrust against Lahore consisted of the 1st Infantry Division supported by the three tank regiments of the 2nd Independent Armoured Brigade; they quickly advanced across the border, reaching the Ichhogil (BRB) Canal by 6 September. The Pakistani Army held the bridges over the canal or blew up those it could not hold, effectively stalling any further advance by the Indians on Lahore. One unit of the Indian Jat Regiment, 3 Jat, had also crossed the Icchogil canal and captured the town of Batapore (Jallo Mur to Pakistan) on the west side of the canal. The same day, a counter offensive consisting of an armoured division and infantry division supported by Pakistan Air Force Sabres forced the Indian 15th Division to withdraw to its starting point. Although 3 Jat suffered minimal casualties, the bulk of the damage being taken by ammunition and stores vehicles, the higher commanders had no information of 3 Jat's capture of Batapore and misleading information led to the command to withdraw from Batapore and Dograi to Ghosal-Dial. This move brought extreme disappointment to Lt-Col Desmond Hayde, CO of 3 Jat. Dograi was eventually recaptured by 3 Jat on 21 September, for the second time but after a much harder battle due to Pakistani reinforcements, in the Battle of Dograi.

On 8 September 1965, a company of 5 Maratha Light Infantry was sent to reinforce a Rajasthan Armed Constabulary (RAC) post at Munabao – a strategic hamlet about 250 kilometres from Jodhpur. Their brief was simple. To hold the post and to keep Pakistan's infantry battalions from overrunning the post at bay. But at Maratha Hill (in Munabao) – as the post has now been christened – the Indian company could barely manage to thwart the intense attack for 24 hours. A company of 3 Guards with 954 heavy mortar battery ordered to reinforce the RAC post at Munabao could never reach. The Pakistani Air Force had strafed the entire area, and also hit a railway train coming from Barmer with reinforcements near Gadra road railway station. On 10 September, Munabao fell into Pakistani hands, and efforts to capture the strategic point did not succeed.

On the days following 9 September, both nations' premiere formations were routed in unequal battles. India's 1st Armoured Division, labeled the "pride of the Indian Army", launched an offensive towards Sialkot. The Division divided itself into two prongs, was forced back by the Pakistani 6th Armoured Division at Chawinda and was forced to withdraw after suffering heavy losses of nearly 100 tanks.

The Pakistanis followed up their success by launching Operation Windup, which forced the Indians back farther. Similarly, Pakistan's pride, the 1st Armoured Division, pushed an offensive towards Khem Karan, with the intent to capture Amritsar (a major city in Punjab, India) and the bridge on River Beas to Jalandhar.

The Pakistani 1st Armoured Division never made it past Khem Karan, however, and by the end of 10 September lay disintegrated by the defences of the Indian 4th Mountain Division at what is now known as the Battle of Asal Uttar (lit. meaning – "Real Answer", or more appropriate English equivalent – "Fitting Response"). The area became known as 'Patton Nagar' (Patton Town), because of the large number of US-made Pakistani Patton tanks. Approximately 97 Pakistani tanks were destroyed or abandoned, with only 32 Indian tanks destroyed or damaged.

The hostilities in the Rajasthan sector commenced on 8 September. Initially Pakistan Desert Force and the Hur militia (followers of Pir Pagaro) was placed in a defensive role, a role for which they were well suited as it turned out. The Hurs were familiar with the terrain and the local area and possessed many essential desert survival skills which their opponents and their comrades in the Pakistan Army did not. Fighting as mainly light infantry, the Hur inflicted many casualties on the Indian forces as they entered Sindh. The Hurs were also employed as skirmishers, harassing the Indians LOC, a task they often undertook on camels. As the battle wore on the Hurs and the Desert Force were increasingly used to attack and capture Indian villages inside Rajasthan.

The war was heading for a stalemate, with both nations holding territory of the other. The Indian army suffered 3,000 battlefield deaths, while Pakistan suffered 3,800. The territory occupied by India was mainly in the fertile Sialkot, Lahore and Kashmir sectors, while Pakistani ground gains were primarily in deserts opposite Sindh and in the Chumb sector near Kashmir. Pakistan claims that it held  of Indian territory, while losing  of its own territory.

Aerial warfare 

The war saw the aircraft of Indian Air Force (IAF) and the Pakistan Air Force (PAF) engaging in combat for the first time since independence. Although the two forces had previously faced off in the First Kashmir War during the late 1940s, that engagement was very limited in scale compared to the 1965 conflict.

The IAF was flying large numbers of Hawker Hunters, Indian-manufactured Folland Gnats, de Havilland Vampires, EE Canberra bombers and a squadron of MiG-21s. The PAF's fighter force comprised 102 F-86F Sabres and 12 F-104 Starfighters, along with 24 B-57 Canberra bombers. During the conflict, the PAF claimed it was out-numbered by around 5:1.

The PAF's aircraft were largely of American origin, whereas the IAF flew an assortment of British and Soviet aeroplanes. However, the PAF's American aircraft were superior to those of the IAF's.

The F-86 was vulnerable to the diminutive Folland Gnat, nicknamed "Sabre Slayer". The Gnat is credited by many independent and Indian sources as having shot down seven Pakistani Canadair Sabres in the 1965 war. while two Gnats were downed by PAF fighters. The PAF's F-104 Starfighter of the PAF was the fastest fighter operating in the subcontinent at that time and was often referred to as "the pride of the PAF". However, according to Sajjad Haider, the F-104 did not deserve this reputation. Being "a high level interceptor designed to neutralise Soviet strategic bombers in altitudes above 40,000 feet," rather than engage in dogfights with agile fighters at low altitudes, it was "unsuited to the tactical environment of the region". In combat the Starfighter was not as effective as the IAF's far more agile, albeit much slower, Folland Gnat fighter. Yet it zoomed into an ongoing dogfight between Sabres and Gnats, at supersonic speed, successfully broke off the fight and caused the Gnats to egress. An IAF Gnat, piloted by Squadron Leader Brij Pal Singh Sikand, landed at an abandoned Pakistani airstrip at Pasrur, as he lacked the fuel to return to his base, and was captured by the Pakistan Army. According to the pilot, he got separated from his formation due to a malfunctioning compass and radio. This Gnat is displayed as a war trophy in the Pakistan Air Force Museum, Karachi. Sqn Ldr Saad Hatmi who flew the captured aircraft to Sargodha, and later tested and evaluated its flight performance, was of view that Gnat was no "Sabre Slayer" when it came to dog fighting. Three Indian civilian aircraft were shot down by PAF, one of which shot down at Bhuj, Gujarat was carrying Balwantrai Mehta, chief minister of the Indian state of Gujarat, total 8 killed in the incident along with Balwantrai Mehta and his wife. The Pakistan Air Force had fought well in countering the much larger Indian Air Force and supported the ground forces.

The two countries have made contradictory claims of combat losses during the war and few neutral sources have verified the claims of either country. The PAF claimed it shot down 104 IAF planes and lost 19 of its own, while the IAF claimed it shot down 73 PAF planes and lost 59. According to PAF, It flew 86 F-86 Sabres, 10 F-104 Starfighters and 20 B-57 Canberras in a parade soon after the war was over. Thus disproving the IAF's claim of downing 73 PAF fighters, which at the time constituted nearly the entire Pakistani front-line fighter force.
Indian sources have pointed out that, despite PAF claims of losing only a squadron of combat craft, Pakistan sought to acquire additional aircraft from Indonesia, Iraq, Iran, Turkey and China within 10 days of the beginning of the war.

The two air forces were rather equal in the conflict, because much of the Indian air force remained farther east to guard against the possibility of China entering the war.
According to the independent sources, the PAF lost some 20 aircraft while the Indians lost 60–75. Pakistan ended the war having depleted 17 percent of its front line strength, while India's losses amounted to less than 10 percent. Moreover, the loss rate had begun to even out, and it has been estimated that another three week's fighting would have seen the Pakistani losses rising to 33 percent and India's losses totalling 15 percent. Air superiority was not achieved, and were unable to prevent IAF fighter bombers and reconnaissance Canberras from flying daylight missions over Pakistan. Thus 1965 was a stalemate in terms of the air war with neither side able to achieve complete air superiority. However, according to Kenneth Werrell, the Pakistan Air Force "did well in the conflict and probably had the edge". When hostilities broke out, the Pakistan Air Force with around 100 F-86s faced an enemy with five times as many combat aircraft; the Indians were also equipped with comparatively modern aircraft inventory. Despite this, Werrell credits the PAF as having the advantage of a "decade's experience with the Sabre" and pilots with long flight hours experience. One Pakistani fighter pilot, MM Alam, was credited with the record of downing five Indian aircraft in less than a minute, becoming the first known flying ace since the Korean War. However, his claims were never confirmed by the PAF and is disputed by Indian sources and some PAF officials.

Tank battles 

The 1965 war witnessed some of the largest tank battles since World War II. At the beginning of the war, the Pakistani Army had both a numerical advantage in tanks, as well as better equipment overall. Pakistani armour was largely American-made; it consisted mainly of Patton M-47 and M-48 tanks, but also included many M4 Sherman tanks, some M24 Chaffee light tanks and M36 Jackson tank destroyers, equipped with 90 mm guns. The bulk of India's tank fleet were older M4 Sherman tanks; some were up-gunned with the French high velocity CN 75 50 guns and could hold their own, whilst some older models were still equipped with the inferior 75 mm M3 L/40 gun. Besides the M4 tanks, India fielded the British-made Centurion Tank Mk 7, with the 105 mm Royal Ordnance L7 gun, and the AMX-13, PT-76, and M3 Stuart light tanks. Pakistan fielded a greater number and more modern artillery; its guns out-ranged those of the Indian artillery, according to Pakistan's Major General T.H. Malik.

At the outbreak of war in 1965, Pakistan had about 15 armoured cavalry regiments, each with about 45 tanks in three squadrons. Besides the Pattons, there were about 200 M4 Shermans re-armed with 76 mm guns, 150 M24 Chaffee light tank and a few independent squadrons of M36B1 tank destroyers. Most of these regiments served in Pakistan's two armoured divisions, the 1st and 6th Armoured divisions – the latter being in the process of formation.

The Indian Army of the time possessed 17 cavalry regiments, and in the 1950s had begun modernizing them by the acquisition of 164 AMX-13 light tanks and 188 Centurions. The remainder of the cavalry units were equipped with M4 Shermans and a small number of M3A3 Stuart light tanks. India had only a single armoured division, the 1st 'Black Elephant' Armoured Division, which consisted of the 17th Horse (The Poona Horse), also called 'Fakhr-i-Hind' ('Pride of India'), the 4th Horse (Hodson's Horse), the 16th Cavalry, the 7th Light Cavalry, the 2nd Lancers, the 18th Cavalry and the 62nd Cavalry, the two first named being equipped with Centurions. There was also the 2nd Independent Armoured Brigade, one of whose three regiments, the 3rd Cavalry, was also equipped with Centurions.

Despite the qualitative and numerical superiority of Pakistani armour, Pakistan was outfought on the battlefield by India, which made progress into the Lahore-Sialkot sector, whilst halting Pakistan's counteroffensive on Amritsar; they were sometimes employed in a faulty manner, such as charging prepared defences during the defeat of Pakistan's 1st Armoured Division at Asal Uttar.

After India breached the Madhupur canal on 11 September, the Khem Karan counter-offensive was halted, affecting Pakistan's strategy substantially. Although India's tank formations experienced some results, India's attack at the Battle of Chawinda, led by its 1st Armoured Division and supporting units, was brought to halt by the newly raised 6th Armoured Division (ex-100th independent brigade group) in the Chawinda sector. Pakistan claimed that Indians lost 120 tanks at Chawinda. compared to 44 of its own But later, Indian official sources confirmed India lost only 29 tanks at Chawinda.
Neither the Indian nor Pakistani Army showed any great facility in the use of armoured formations in offensive operations, whether the Pakistani 1st Armoured Division at Asal Uttar (Battle of Asal Uttar) or the Indian 1st Armoured Division at Chawinda. In contrast, both proved adept with smaller forces in a defensive role such as India's 2nd Armoured Brigade at Asal Uttar and Pakistan's 25th Cavalry at Chawinda.
The Centurion battle tank, with its 105 mm gun and heavy armour, performed better than the overly complex Pattons.

Naval hostilities 

Naval operations did not play a prominent role in the war of 1965. Operation Dwarka, as it is known, is a significant naval operation of the 1965 war contested as a nuisance raid by some. The attack on Dwarka led to questions being asked in India's parliament and subsequent post-war modernization and expansion of the Indian Navy, with an increase in budget from Rs. 35 crores to Rs. 115 crores.

According to some Pakistani sources, one submarine, kept the Indian Navy's aircraft carrier  besieged in Bombay throughout the war. It is however acknowledged, that the Vikrant was in dry dock refitting at that time and was incapable of any action. Indian sources claim that it was not their intention to get into a naval conflict with Pakistan, and wished to restrict the war to a land-based conflict.

Covert operations 
The Pakistan Army launched a number of covert operations to infiltrate and sabotage Indian airbases. On 7 September 1965, the Special Services Group (SSG) commandos were parachuted into enemy territory. According to Commander-in-Chief of the Pakistan Army General Muhammad Musa, about 135 commandos were airdropped at three Indian airfields (Halwara, Pathankot and Adampur). The daring attempt proved to be an "unmitigated disaster". Only 22 commandos returned to Pakistan as planned, 93 were taken prisoner (including one of the Commanders of the operations, Major Khalid Butt), and 20 were killed in encounters with the army, police or civilians. The reason for the failure of the commando mission is attributed to the failure to provide maps, proper briefings and adequate planning or preparation.

Despite failing to sabotage the airfields, Pakistan sources claim that the commando mission affected some planned Indian operations. As the Indian 14th Infantry Division was diverted to hunt for paratroopers, the Pakistan Air Force found the road filled with transport, and destroyed many vehicles.

India responded to the covert activity by announcing rewards for captured Pakistani spies or paratroopers. Meanwhile, in Pakistan, rumors spread that India had retaliated with its own covert operations, sending commandos deep into Pakistan territory, but these rumors were later determined to be unfounded.

Assessment of losses 
India and Pakistan make widely divergent claims about the damage they inflicted on each other and the amount of damage suffered by them. The following summarizes each nation's claims.

Neutral assessments 

There have been several neutral assessments of the losses incurred by both India and Pakistan during the war. Most of these assessments agree that India had the upper hand over Pakistan when ceasefire was declared. Some of the neutral assessments are mentioned below —
 According to the Library of Congress Country Studies conducted by the Federal Research Division of the United States –

The war was militarily inconclusive; each side held prisoners and some territory belonging to the other. Losses were relatively heavy—on the Pakistani side, twenty aircraft, 200 tanks, and 3,800 troops. Pakistan's army had been able to withstand Indian pressure, but a continuation of the fighting would only have led to further losses and ultimate defeat for Pakistan. Most Pakistanis, schooled in the belief of their own martial prowess, refused to accept the possibility of their country's military defeat by "Hindu India" and were, instead, quick to blame their failure to attain their military aims on what they considered to be the ineptitude of Ayub Khan and his government.
 Former New York Times reporter Arif Jamal wrote in his book Shadow War —
Despite the obvious strength of the Indian wins, both countries claim to have been victorious.

 Devin T. Hagerty wrote in his book South Asia in world politics –

The invading Indian forces outfought their Pakistani counterparts and halted their attack on the outskirts of Lahore, Pakistan's second-largest city. By the time United Nations intervened on September 22, Pakistan had suffered a clear defeat.
 In his book National identity and geopolitical visions, Gertjan Dijkink writes –

The superior Indian forces, however, won a decisive victory and the army could have even marched on into Pakistani territory had external pressure not forced both combatants to cease their war efforts.
 An excerpt from Stanley Wolpert's India, summarizing the Indo-Pakistani War of 1965,

In three weeks the second Indo-Pak War ended in what appeared to be a draw when the embargo placed by Washington on U.S. ammunition and replacements for both armies forced cessation of conflict before either side won a clear victory. India, however, was in a position to inflict grave damage to, if not capture, Pakistan's capital of the Punjab when the cease-fire was called, and controlled Kashmir's strategic Uri-Poonch bulge, much to Ayub's chagrin.
 In his book titled The greater game: India's race with destiny and China, David Van Praagh wrote –

India won the war. It held on to the Vale of Kashmir, the prize Pakistan vainly sought. It gained  of Pakistani territory:  in Azad Kashmir, Pakistan's portion of the state;  of the Sailkot sector;  far to the south of Sindh; and most critical,  on the Lahore front. Pakistan took  of Indian territory:  in the Chhamb sector and  around Khem Karan.
 Dennis Kux's India and the United States estranged democracies also provides a summary of the war,

Although both sides lost heavily in men and material, and neither gained a decisive military advantage, India had the better of the war. New Delhi achieved its basic goal of thwarting Pakistan's attempt to seize Kashmir by force. Pakistan gained nothing from a conflict which it had instigated.

 A region in turmoil: South Asian conflicts since 1947 by Robert Johnson mentions –

 An excerpt from William M. Carpenter and David G. Wiencek's Asian security handbook: terrorism and the new security environment –

A brief but furious 1965 war with India began with a covert Pakistani thrust across the Kashmiri cease-fire line and ended up with the city of Lahore threatened with encirclement by Indian Army. Another UN-sponsored cease-fire left borders unchanged, but Pakistan's vulnerability had again been exposed.
 English historian John Keay's India: A History provides a summary of the 1965 war –

The 1965 Indo-Pak war lasted barely a month. Pakistan made gains in the Rajasthan desert but its main push against India's Jammu-Srinagar road link was repulsed and Indian tanks advanced to within a sight of Lahore. Both sides claimed victory but India had most to celebrate.
 Uk Heo and Shale Asher Horowitz write in their book Conflict in Asia: Korea, China-Taiwan, and India-Pakistan –

Again India appeared, logistically at least, to be in a superior position but neither side was able to mobilize enough strength to gain a decisive victory.

 According to the Office of the Historian within the U.S Department of State:

Conflict resumed again in early 1965, when Pakistani and Indian forces clashed over disputed territory along the border between the two nations. Hostilities intensified that August when the Pakistani army attempted to take Kashmir by force. The attempt to seize the state was unsuccessful, and the second India-Pakistan War reached a stalemate.

Ceasefire 
On 20 September, the United Nations Security Council unanimously passed a resolution, which noted that its previous two resolutions went "unheeded" and now demanded an unconditional ceasefire from both nations within 48 hours.
India immediately accepted, while Pakistan accepted it on 23 September, with some notable dramatics.

India and Pakistan accused each other of ceasefire violations; India charged Pakistan with 585 violations in 34 days, while Pakistan countered with accusations of 450 incidents by India. In addition to the expected exchange of small arms and artillery fire, India reported that Pakistan utilized the ceasefire to capture the Indian village of Chananwalla in the Fazilka sector. This village was recaptured by Indian troops on 25 December. On 10 October, a B-57 Canberra on loan to the PAF was damaged by 3 SA-2 missiles fired from the IAF base at Ambala. A Pakistani Army Auster AOP was shot down on 16 December, killing one Pakistani army captain; on 2 February 1967, an AOP was shot down by IAF Hunters.

The ceasefire remained in effect until the start of the Indo-Pakistani War of 1971.

Truce agreement 
The United States and the Soviet Union used significant diplomatic tools to prevent any further escalation in the conflict between the two South Asian nations. The Soviet Union, led by Premier Alexei Kosygin, hosted peace negotiations in Tashkent (now in Uzbekistan), where Indian Prime Minister Lal Bahadur Shastri and Pakistani President Ayub Khan signed the Tashkent Agreement on 10 January 1966, agreeing to withdraw to pre-August lines no later than 25 February 1966.

India's Prime Minister, Shastri, suffered a fatal heart attack soon after the Tashkent Agreement on 11 January 1966. As a consequence, the public outcry in India against the peace declaration transformed into a wave of sympathy for the ruling Indian National Congress.

Public perceptions 
The ceasefire was criticised by many Pakistanis who, relying on fabricated official reports and the controlled Pakistani press, believed that the leadership had surrendered military gains. The protests led to student riots. Pakistan State's reports had suggested that their military was performing admirably in the war – which they incorrectly blamed as being initiated by India – and thus the Tashkent Declaration was seen as having forfeited the gains. Some recent books written by Pakistani authors, including one by ex-ISI chief Lieutenant General Mahmud Ahmed Durrani initially titled The Myth of 1965 Victory, reportedly exposed Pakistani fabrications about the war, but all copies of the book were bought by Pakistan Army to prevent circulation because the topic was "too sensitive". The book was published with the revised title History of Indo Pak War 1965, published by Services Book Club, a part of the Pakistan military and printed by Oxford University Press, Karachi. A few copies of the book have survived. A version was published in India as Illusion of Victory: A Military History of the Indo-Pak War-1965 by Lexicon Publishers. Recently a new Pakistani impression has been published in 2017.

Intelligence failures 
Strategic miscalculations by both India and Pakistan ensured that the war ended in a stalemate.

Indian miscalculations 

Indian military intelligence gave no warning of the impending Pakistan invasion. The Indian Army failed to recognize the presence of heavy Pakistani artillery and armaments in Chumb and suffered significant losses as a result.

The "Official War History – 1965", drafted by the Ministry of Defence of India in 1992, was a long suppressed document that revealed other miscalculations. According to the document, on 22 September when the Security Council was pressing for a ceasefire, the Indian Prime Minister asked commanding Gen. Chaudhuri if India could possibly win the war, were he to delay accepting the ceasefire. The general replied that most of India's frontline ammunition had been used up and the Indian Army had suffered considerable tank losses. It was determined later that only 14% of India's frontline ammunition had been fired and India held twice the number of tanks as Pakistan. By this time, the Pakistani Army had used close to 80% of its ammunition.

Air Chief Marshal (retd) P.C. Lal, who was the Vice Chief of Air Staff during the conflict, points to the lack of coordination between the IAF and the Indian army. Neither side revealed its battle plans to the other. The battle plans drafted by the Ministry of Defence and General Chaudhari, did not specify a role for the Indian Air Force in the order of battle. This attitude of Gen. Chaudhari was referred to by ACM Lal as the "Supremo Syndrome", a patronizing attitude sometimes held by the Indian army towards the other branches of the Indian Military.

Pakistani miscalculations 
The Pakistani Army's failures started with the supposition that a generally discontented Kashmiri people, given the opportunity provided by the Pakistani advance, would revolt against their Indian rulers, bringing about a swift and decisive surrender of Kashmir. The Kashmiri people, however, did not revolt. Instead, the Indian Army was provided with enough information to learn of Operation Gibraltar and the fact that the Army was battling not insurgents, as they had initially supposed, but Pakistani Army regulars.

The Pakistani Army also failed to recognize that the Indian policy makers would order an attack on the southern sector in order to open a second front. Pakistan was forced to dedicate troops to the southern sector to protect Sialkot and Lahore instead using them to support penetrating into Kashmir.

"Operation Grand Slam", which was launched by Pakistan to capture Akhnoor, a town north-east of Jammu and a key region for communications between Kashmir and the rest of India, was also a failure. Many Pakistani commentators criticised the Ayub Khan administration for being indecisive during Operation Grand Slam. These critics claim that the operation failed because Ayub Khan knew the importance of Akhnoor to India (having called it India's "jugular vein") and did not want to capture it and drive the two nations into an all-out war. Despite progress being made in Akhnoor, General Ayub Khan relieved the commanding Major General Akhtar Hussain Malik and replaced him with Gen. Yahya Khan. A 24-hour lull ensued the replacement, which allowed the Indian army to regroup in Akhnoor and successfully oppose a lackluster attack headed by General Yahya Khan. "The enemy came to our rescue," asserted the Indian Chief of Staff of the Western Command. Later, Akhtar Hussain Malik criticised Ayub Khan for planning Operation Gibraltar, which was doomed to fail, and for relieving him of his command at a crucial moment in the war. Malik threatened to expose the truth about the war and the army's failure, but later dropped the idea for fear of being banned.

Some authors have noted that Pakistan might have been emboldened by a war game – conducted in March 1965, at the Institute for Defense Analyses in the United States. The exercise concluded that, in the event of a war with India, Pakistan would win. Other authors like Stephen P. Cohen, have consistently commented that the Pakistan Army had "acquired an exaggerated view of the weakness of both India and the Indian military ... the 1965 war was a shock."

Pakistani Air Marshal and Commander-in-Chief of PAF during the war, Nur Khan, later said that the Pakistan Army, and not India, should be blamed for starting the war. However propaganda in Pakistan about the war continued; the war was not rationally analysed in Pakistan, with most of the blame being heaped on the leadership and little importance given to intelligence failures that persisted until the debacle of the Indo-Pakistani War of 1971.

Involvement of other nations 
The United States and the United Kingdom had been the principal suppliers of military materiél to India and Pakistan since 1947. Both India and Pakistan were Commonwealth republics. While India had pursued a policy of nominal non-alignment, Pakistan was a member of both CENTO and SEATO and a purported ally of the West in its struggle against Communism. Well before the conflict began, however, Britain and the United States had suspected Pakistan of joining both alliances out of opportunism to acquire advanced weapons for a war against India. They had therefore limited their military aid to Pakistan to maintain the existing balance of power in the subcontinent. In 1959, however, Pakistan and the United States had signed an Agreement of Cooperation under which the United States agreed to take "appropriate action, including the use of armed forces" in order to assist the Government of Pakistan at its request. By 1965, American and British analysts had recognised the two international groupings, CENTO and SEATO, and Pakistan's continued alliance with the West as being largely meaningless.

Following the start of the 1965 war, both the United States and Britain took the view that the conflict was largely Pakistan's fault, and suspended all arms shipments to both India and Pakistan. While the United States maintained a neutral stance, the British Prime Minister, Harold Wilson, condemned India for aggression after its army advanced towards Lahore; his statement was met with a furious rebuttal from India.

Internationally, the level of support which Pakistan received was limited at best. Iran and Turkey issued a joint communiqué on 10 September which placed the blame on India, backed the United Nations' appeal for a cease-fire and offered to deploy troops for a UN peacekeeping mission in Kashmir. Pakistan received support from Indonesia, Iran, Turkey, and Saudi Arabia in the form of six naval vessels, jet fuel, guns and ammunition and financial support, respectively.

Since before the war, the People's Republic of China had been a major military associate of Pakistan and a military opponent of India, with whom it had fought a brief war in 1962. China had also become a foreign patron for Pakistan and had given Pakistan $60 million in development assistance in 1965. During the war, China openly supported the Pakistani position. It took advantage of the conflict to issue a strongly worded ultimatum to India condemning its "aggression" in Tibet and hinting at nuclear retaliation by China (China had exploded its first nuclear device the previous year). Despite strong fears of Chinese intervention on the side of Pakistan, the Chinese government ultimately exercised restraint. This was partly due to the logistical difficulties of a direct Chinese military intervention against India and India's improved military strength after its defeat by China in 1962. China had also received strong warnings by the American and Soviet governments against expanding the scope of the conflict by intervening. In the face of this pressure, China backed down, extending the deadline for India to respond to its ultimatum and warning India against attacking East Pakistan. Ultimately, Pakistan rejected Chinese offers of military aid, recognising that accepting it would only result in further alienating Pakistan internationally. International opinion considered China's actions to be dangerously reckless and aggressive, and it was soundly rebuked in the world press for its unnecessarily provocative stance during the conflict.

India's participation in the Non-Aligned Movement yielded little support from its members. Support given by Indonesia to Pakistan was seen as a major Indian diplomatic failure, as Indonesia had been among the founding members of the Non-Aligned Movement along with India. Despite its close relations with India, the Soviet Union was more neutral than other nations during the war, inviting both nations to peace talks under its aegis in Tashkent.

Aftermath

India 

Despite the declaration of a ceasefire, India was perceived as the victor due to its success in halting the Pakistan-backed insurgency in Kashmir. In its October 1965 issue, the TIME magazine quoted a Western official assessing the consequences of the war —

Now it's apparent to everybody that India is going to emerge as an Asian power in its own right.

In light of the failures of the Sino-Indian War, the outcome of the 1965 war was viewed as a "politico-strategic" victory in India. The Indian prime minister, Lal Bahadur Shastri, was hailed as a national hero in India.

While the overall performance of the Indian military was praised, military leaders were criticised for their failure to effectively deploy India's superior armed forces so as to achieve a decisive victory over Pakistan. In his book War in the modern world since 1815, noted war historian Jeremy Black said that though Pakistan "lost heavily" during the 1965 war, India's hasty decision to call for negotiations prevented further considerable damage to the Pakistan Armed Forces. He elaborates —

India's chief of army staff urged negotiations on the ground that they were running out ammunition and their number of tanks had become seriously depleted. In fact, the army had used less than 15% of its ammunition compared to Pakistan, which had consumed closer to 80 percent and India had double the number of serviceable tanks.

In 2015, Marshal of the Indian Air Force Arjan Singh, the last surviving armed force commander of the conflict, gave his assessment that the war ended in a stalemate, but only due to international pressure for a ceasefire, and that India would have achieved a decisive victory had hostilities continued for a few days more:

For political reasons, Pakistan claims victory in the 1965 war. In my opinion, the war ended in a kind of stalemate. We were in a position of strength. Had the war continued for a few more days, we would have gained a decisive victory. I advised then prime minister Lal Bahadur Shastri not to agree for ceasefire. But I think he was under pressure from the United Nations and some countries.

As a consequence, India focussed on enhancing communication and coordination within and among the tri-services of the Indian Armed Forces. Partly as a result of the inefficient information gathering preceding the war, India established the Research and Analysis Wing for external espionage and intelligence. Major improvements were also made in command and control to address various shortcomings and the positive impact of these changes was clearly visible during the Indo-Pakistani War of 1971 when India achieved a decisive victory over Pakistan within two weeks.

China's repeated threats to intervene in the conflict in support of Pakistan increased pressure on the government to take an immediate decision to develop nuclear weapons. Despite repeated assurances, the United States did little to prevent extensive use of American arms by Pakistani forces during the conflict, thus irking India. At the same time, the United States and United Kingdom refused to supply India with sophisticated weaponry which further strained the relations between the West and India. These developments led to a significant change in India's foreign policy – India, which had previously championed the cause of non-alignment, distanced itself further from Western powers and developed close relations with the Soviet Union. By the end of the 1960s, the Soviet Union emerged as the biggest supplier of military hardware to India. From 1967 to 1977, 81% of India's arms imports were from the Soviet Union. After the 1965 war, the arms race between India and Pakistan became even more asymmetric and India was outdistancing Pakistan by far. India's defence budget too would increase gradually after the war, in 1966–1967 it would rise to 17% and by 1970–1971 it would rise to 25% of its revenue. However, according to the world bank data India's defence expenditure by GDP decrease from 3.871% in 1965 to 3.141% in 1969, thereafter slightly increased to 3.652% in 1971.

Pakistan 
At the conclusion of the war, many Pakistanis considered the performance of their military to be positive. 6 September is celebrated as Defence Day in Pakistan, in commemoration of the successful defence of Lahore against the Indian army. The performance of the Pakistani Air Force, in particular, was praised.

However, the Pakistani government was accused by analysts of spreading disinformation among its citizens regarding the actual consequences of the war. In his book Mainsprings of Indian and Pakistani foreign policies, S.M. Burke writes —
After the Indo-Pakistani war of 1965 the balance of military power had decisively shifted in favor of India. Pakistan had found it difficult to replace the heavy equipment lost during that conflict while her adversary, despite her economic and political problems, had been determinedly building up her strength.
Air Marshal (retired) Nur Khan, who headed the Pakistan Air Force in 1965, said in an interview with Dawn newspaper —
The army "misled the nation with a big lie" - that India rather than Pakistan provoked the war - and that Pakistan won a "great victory".

And since the "lie" was never rectified, the Pakistani "army came to believe its own fiction, (and) has continued to fight unwanted wars,"
Pakistani commentator Haidar Imtiaz remarked:
The myth of ‘victory’ was created after the war had ended, in order to counter Indian claims of victory on the one hand and to shield the Ayub regime and the army from criticism on the other.
A book titled Indo-Pakistan War of 1965: A Flashback, produced by the Inter-Services Public Relations of Pakistan, is used as the official history of the war, which omits any mention of the operations Gibraltar and Grand Slam, and begins with the Indian counter-offensive on the Lahore front. The Pakistan Army is claimed to have put up a "valiant defense of the motherland" and forced the attack in its tracks.

Most observers agree that the myth of a mobile, hard hitting Pakistan Army was badly dented in the war, as critical breakthroughs were not made. Several Pakistani writers criticised the military's ill-founded belief that their "martial race" of soldiers could defeat "Hindu India" in the war. Rasul Bux Rais, a Pakistani political analyst wrote –

The 1965 war with India proved that Pakistan could neither break the formidable Indian defences in a blitzkrieg fashion nor could she sustain an all-out conflict for long.

Historian Akbar S Zaidi notes that Pakistan "lost terribly in the 1965 war".

The Pakistan airforce on the other hand gained a lot of credibility and reliability among Pakistan military and international war writers for successful defence of Lahore and other important areas of Pakistan and heavy retaliation to India on the next day. The alertness of the airforce was also related to the fact that some pilots were scrambled 6 times in less than an hour on indication of Indian air raids. The Pakistan airforce along with the army is celebrated on Defence Day and Airforce Day in commemoration of this in Pakistan (6 and 7 September respectively).

Moreover, Pakistan had lost more ground than it had gained during the war and, more importantly, failed to achieve its goal of capturing Kashmir; this result has been viewed by many impartial observers as a defeat for Pakistan.

Many senior Pakistani officials and military experts later criticised the faulty planning of Operation Gibraltar, which ultimately led to the war. The Tashkent declaration was also criticised in Pakistan, though few citizens realised the gravity of the situation that existed at the end of the war. Political leaders were also criticised. Following the advice of Zulfikar Ali Bhutto, Pakistan's foreign minister, Ayub Khan had raised very high expectations among the people of Pakistan about the superiority – if not invincibility – of its armed forces, but Pakistan's inability to attain its military aims during the war created a political liability for Ayub. The defeat of its Kashmiri ambitions in the war led to the army's invincibility being challenged by an increasingly vocal opposition.

One of the farthest reaching consequences of the war was the wide-scale economic slowdown in Pakistan. The war ended the impressive economic growth Pakistan had experienced since the early 1960s. Between 1964 and 1966, Pakistan's defence spending rose from 4.82% to 9.86% of GDP, putting a tremendous strain on Pakistan's economy. By 1970–71, defence spending comprised a whopping 32% or 55.66% of government expenditure. According to veterans of the war, the war greatly cost Pakistan economically, politically, and militarily. Nuclear theorist Feroze Khan maintained that the 1965 war was a last conventional attempt to snatch Kashmir by military force, and Pakistan's own position in the international community, especially with the United States, began to deteriorate from the point the war started, while on the other hand, the alliance with China saw improvements. Chairman joint chiefs General Tariq Majid claims in his memoirs that Chou En-Lai had longed advised the government in the classic style of Sun Tzu: "to go slow, not to push India hard; and avoid a fight over Kashmir, 'for at least, 20–30 years, until you have developed your economy and consolidated your national power'." General Majid maintained in Eating Grass that the "sane, philosophical and political critical thinking" was missing in Pakistan, and that the country had lost extensive human resources by fighting the war.

Pakistan was surprised by the lack of support from the United States, an ally with whom the country had signed an Agreement of Cooperation. The US turned neutral in the war when it cut off military supplies to Pakistan (and India); an action that the Pakistanis took as a sign of betrayal. After the war, Pakistan would increasingly look towards China as a major source of military hardware and political support.

Another negative consequence of the war was growing resentment against the Pakistani government in East Pakistan (present day Bangladesh), particularly for West Pakistan's obsession with Kashmir. Bengali leaders accused the central government of not providing adequate security for East Pakistan during the conflict, even though large sums of money were taken from the east to finance the war for Kashmir. In fact, despite some Pakistan Air Force attacks being launched from bases in East Pakistan during the war, India did not retaliate in that sector, although East Pakistan was defended only by an understrengthed infantry division (14th Division), sixteen planes and no tanks. Sheikh Mujibur Rahman was critical of the disparity in military resources deployed in East and West Pakistan, calling for greater autonomy for East Pakistan, an action that ultimately led to the Bangladesh Liberation War and another war between India and Pakistan in 1971.

Pakistan celebrates Defence Day every year to commemorate 6 September 1965 to pay tribute to the soldiers killed in the war. However, Pakistani journalists, including Taha Siddiqui and Haseeb Asif have criticized the celebration of Defence Day.

Awards

National awards 
 Santu Jouharmal Shahaney, an IOFS officer, served as the first Indian Director General Ordnance Factories (DGOF). He was awarded Padma Bhushan, by the Government of India, in the Civil Service category.
K. C. Banerjee, an IOFS officer. Received Padma Shri in 1967, for his contributions during the Indo-Pakistani War of 1965, as the General Manager of Rifle Factory Ishapore,  that developed and manufactured the 7.62 Self-Loading Automatic Rifle, that played decisive role in India's victory in the Indo-Pakistani War of 1965.
 Joginder Singh Dhillon, Lt. Gen, awarded the Padma Bhushan in 1966 by the Government of India for his role in the 1965 war, becoming the first Indian Army officer to receive the award.

Gallantry awards 
For bravery, the following soldiers were awarded the highest gallantry award of their respective countries, the Indian award Param Vir Chakra and the Pakistani award Nishan-e-Haider:
India
 Company Quarter Master Havildar Abdul Hamid (Posthumous)
 Lieutenant-Colonel Ardeshir Burzorji Tarapore (Posthumous)
Pakistan
 Major Raja Aziz Bhatti Shaheed (Posthumous)

Battle honours 
After the war, a total of 16 battle honours and 3 theatre honours were awarded to units of the Indian Army, the notable amongst which are: 

 Jammu and Kashmir 1965 (theatre honour)
 Punjab 1965 (theatre honour)
 Rajasthan 1965 (theatre honour)
 Assal Uttar
 Burki
 Dograi
 Hajipir
 Hussainiwala
 Kalidhar
 OP Hill
 Phillora

See also 
 Indo-Pakistani War of 1971
 Post–World War II air-to-air combat losses

Notes

References

Bibliography 

 First & Further reflections on the second Kashmir War (South Asia series) – 2 books by Louis Dupree.

 
 
 
 
 
 

 
 

 
 
 
 
 

 
 

 
 
 

 
 
 Tarapore, Arzan. 2019. "Defence without deterrence: India’s strategy in the 1965 war." Security Studies.Defence without deterrence: India’s strategy in the 1965 war

External links 

 Records of the United Nations India-Pakistan Observation Mission (UNIPOM) (1965–1966) at the United Nations Archives
IAF Combat Kills – 1965 war,(Center for Indian Military History)
 
 United States Library of Congress Country Studies – India
 Official History of the Indian Armed Forces in the 1965 War with Pakistan
 Grand Slam – A Battle of lost Opportunities, Maj (Retd) Agha Humayun Amin – very detailed roll of events and analysis
 The India-Pakistan War, 1965: 40 Years On – From Rediff.com
 Lessons of the 1965 War from Daily Times (Pakistan)
 Spirit of '65 & the parallels with today – Ayaz Amir

 
Indo-Pakistani wars
Wars involving India
1960s in Jammu and Kashmir
1965 Indo-Pakistani War